Inception v3 is a convolutional neural network for assisting in image analysis and object detection, and got its start as a module for GoogLeNet. It is the third edition of Google's Inception Convolutional Neural Network, originally introduced during the ImageNet Recognition Challenge. The design of Inceptionv3 was intended to allow deeper networks while also keeping the number of parameters from growing too large: it has "under 25 million parameters", compared against 60 million for AlexNet.

Just as ImageNet can be thought of as a database of classified visual objects, Inception helps classification of objects in the world of computer vision. The Inceptionv3 architecture has been reused in many different applications, often used "pre-trained" from ImageNet. One such use is in life sciences, where it aids in the research of leukemia.

The original name (Inception) was codenamed this way after a popular "'we need to go deeper' internet meme" went viral, quoting a phrase from the Inception film of Christopher Nolan.

References

Neural networks